Motorsport Ireland is the National Governing Body for four-wheeled motorsports in the Republic of Ireland. Motorsport Ireland is affiliated to the supreme authority for world motorsport, the Fédération Internationale de l'Automobile (FIA) based in Geneva and Paris.

Motorsport Ireland jurisdiction covers the 26 counties and has under its umbrella 34 affiliated motor clubs that are the actual organisers of all sporting events. In each year there are approximately 230 events listed in the official calendar and these cover 11 different branches of the sport.  On average, each year Motorsport Ireland issues over 4,000 Competition Licences to Motorsport.

It is not concerned with motorcycle racing, the governing body is Motorcycling Ireland.

History
Motorsport Ireland was established in 2005 by the Royal Irish Automobile Club (RIAC), an organisation that has been in charge of motor sports in the Republic of Ireland since 1901. The RIAC is the holder of the sporting power on behalf of the FIA in Ireland. This power is delegated on an annual basis to Motorsport Ireland.

Responsibilities

The FIA recognises in each of its affiliated countries, one sole authority that holds the sporting power and in the Republic of Ireland it is the Motorsport Ireland. As such it is responsible for all governance and administration aspects of motorsport organization, as well as controlling the technical, safety and sporting aspects across the various disciplines.

Motorsport Ireland is the licensing authority for race officials, marshals, racing drivers, event organisers as well as media representatives.

Licensing and training
Every person wishing to compete in one of the motorsport events must be the holder of a relevant license issued by Motorsport Ireland or by another national governing body affiliated to the FIA. 
The licenses are issued once the basic requirements are met and the relevant training has been completed.

References

Motorsport in Ireland
Motorsport
Motorsport in the Republic of Ireland
Motorsport competitions in Ireland
Motorsport venues in the Republic of Ireland